Maalan National Park is a national park in the Tablelands Region of Far North Queensland, Australia. There are two sections to the park. The largest section occupies the western third of Beatrice and the eastern fringe of Ravenshoe on the Atherton Tableland. The smaller section is in the north of Maalan. It belongs to the Wet Tropics of Queensland bioregion.  The park was established to protect significant animal and plant communities.  The areas were previously known as Dirran State Forest.  It is adjacent to Tully Gorge National Park and Mount Fisher Forest Reserve.

Mount Fisher is found within the park.  It is Queensland's third highest peak and the most elevated volcano in Northern Australia.

The park provides habitat for the endangered spotted-tailed Quoll, large-eared horseshoe bat and the vulnerable flute-nosed bat.  A total of four rare or threatened species have been recorded in the park. It is also home to over 500 native plants.

See also

 Protected areas of Queensland

References

National parks of Far North Queensland
Protected areas established in 2005
2005 establishments in Australia